Mengkofen is a municipality in the district of Dingolfing-Landau in Bavaria in Germany. It lies in the Aiterach River valley.

Subdivision
The municipality includes 10 former municipalities (Gemarkungen), and other villages:
Hofdorf
Hüttenkofen
Martinsbuch
Mengkofen
Mühlhausen
Puchhausen
Süßkofen
Ginhart
Hagenau
Tunding
Tunzenberg
Weichshofen

References

Dingolfing-Landau